Al Maadeed also spelled Al Maadid or Al Maadhid, is one of the primary tribes in Qatar.

In Qatar, the Al-Maadeed tribe includes these  major families:

Al-Thani
Al-Assiri
Al-Ali
Al-Binali
Al-Badi
 Bin Abood
Al-Jattal
Al-Ibrahim
Al-Mehshadi
Al-Ghanim
Al-Farhood

The ruling family of Qatar are from the Al Maadeed tribe. Though they are mainly present in Qatar, there are Maadeed's in Kuwait as well as Saudi Arabia.  The Al Maadeed's are descendants of the Bani Tamim.

The founder of Qatar Sheikh Mohammed Bin Thani was chosen from Al Maadeed tribe as the leader of modern Qatar. He was chosen because of his good personal characteristics and friendliness. Now, Al-Thani the descendants of Mohammed Bin Thani are chosen as leaders of Qatar.

J.G. Lorimer's book Gazetteer of the Persian Gulf states that, in 1908, there were 875 members of the Al Maadeed tribe in Qatar. They were mainly centered in Al Wakrah, Lusail and the capital Doha.

Ibrahim bin Jarallah bin Dekhnah Al Sharifi's book Al-Maadheed and Qatar: the history and pedigree and civilization pp 144–148 first edition 1999.

References

External links 
 Mariam Al Maadeed

Qatari families
Tribes of Arabia